Bruno Schettino (5 January 1941 Marigliano,– 21 September 2012) was the Roman Catholic archbishop of the Roman Catholic Archdiocese of Capua, Italy.

Ordained to the priesthood in 1964, Schettino was made bishop in 1987 and died while in office.

Notes

Archbishops of Capua
1941 births
2012 deaths
People from Marigliano